Extremadura (F75) is the fifth ship of five Spanish-built s, based on the American  design, of the Spanish Navy.

Laid down on November 1971 and launched on 21 November 1972, Extremadura was commissioned into service on 10 November 1976.

All of these Spanish frigates were built to the size of the Knox frigates.

Other units of class 
 
 
 
 

Ships of the Spanish Navy
1972 ships
Baleares-class frigates
Frigates of the Cold War